Tecóatl Mazatec, also known as Eloxochitlán Mazatec and Northern Highland Mazatec, is a Mazatecan language spoken in the Mexican states of Oaxaca and Puebla, notably in the towns of San Jerónimo Tecóatl, Eloxochitlán de Flores Magón, San Lucas Zoquiapam, Santa Cruz Acatepec, San Pedro Ocopetatillo, San Lorenzo Cuaunecuiltitla, Santa Ana Ateixtlahuaca, and San Francisco Huehuetlán. Egland found 76% intelligibility with Huautla, the prestige variety of Mazatec, though SIL reports that speakers of all dialects "have considerable difficulty understanding the prestigious variant spoken in Huautla de Jiménez"

See Mazatecan languages for a detailed description of these languages.

Phonology

Vowels 
The San Jerónimo Mazatec dialect contains four vowel sounds; /i e a o/.

Consonants 

/w/ may have the allophone /β/.

References

External links
Eloxochitlán Mazatec Mazatec of Eloxochitlán de Flores Magón, Oaxaca. SIL, Mexico.

Mazatecan languages